Satadushani is a work written by Vedanta Desika who lived in the 12th century. He is considered as one among the most illustrious Acharya of the Vaishnavite tradition and is the leader of the Vadagalai sect of the Vaishnavas. Though the title of the work suggests hundred refutations, only 66 of them are now available. Satadushani is a work of logic otherwise called as Tarka in Hindu philosophy. It is a refutation of the nirvesesha Advaita of Sankaracharya. It establishes the validity of the Vishishtadvaita philosophy of Ramanuja as against the Advaita of sankara. It is said that at the age of around 50 or 55 Vedanta Desika was invited by his disciples at Srirangam to engage in a polemical debate with a group of Advaitins from North India. The arguments made in the form of refutations against these men are said to be the content of this work. The late Surendranath Dasgupta in his magnum opus The history of Indian Philosophy has allotted almost 40 pages for this particular book of Vedanta Desika in the third volume of the series. The late R. Kesava Aiyangar, a senior advocate of the Supreme Court of India has written an exhaustive introduction to this work in English for the book titled Vedanta Desika's Satadushani by Srivatsankacharya.

Umamaheshvara's Virodha-varudhini (or Virodha-varuthini) discusses contradictions in Satadushani and other Vishishtadvaita works.

References 

Indian philosophy
12th-century Indian books